Acanthagrion abunae
Acanthagrion adustum
Acanthagrion aepiolum
Acanthagrion amazonicum
Acanthagrion apicale
Acanthagrion ascendens
Acanthagrion chacoense
Acanthagrion chararum
Acanthagrion cuyabae
Acanthagrion dichrostigma
Acanthagrion egleri
Acanthagrion floridense
Acanthagrion fluviatile
Acanthagrion gracile
Acanthagrion hartei
Acanthagrion hildegarda
Acanthagrion hildegarde
Acanthagrion indefensum
Acanthagrion inexpectum
Acanthagrion jessei
Acanthagrion kennedii
Acanthagrion lancea
Acanthagrion latapistylum
Acanthagrion longispinosum
Acanthagrion luteum
Acanthagrion minutum
Acanthagrion obsoletum
Acanthagrion peruanum
Acanthagrion peruvianum
Acanthagrion phallicorne
Acanthagrion quadratum
Acanthagrion rubrifrons
Acanthagrion speculum
Acanthagrion taxaense
Acanthagrion temporale
Acanthagrion tepuiense
Acanthagrion trilobatum
Acanthagrion truncatum
Acanthagrion vidua
Acanthagrion viridescens
Acanthagrion williamsoni
Acanthagrion yungarum
Acanthallagma caeruleum
Acanthallagma luteum
Acanthallagma strohmi
Aceratobasis cornicauda
Aceratobasis mourei
Aceratobasis nathaliae
Aciagrion africanum
Aciagrion approximans
Aciagrion azureum
Aciagrion balachowskyi
Aciagrion borneense
Aciagrion brosseti
Aciagrion congoense
Aciagrion dondoense
Aciagrion fasciculare
Aciagrion feuerborni
Aciagrion fragilis
Aciagrion gracile
Aciagrion hamoni
Aciagrion heterosticta
Aciagrion hisopa
Aciagrion macrootithenae
Aciagrion migratum
Aciagrion nodosum
Aciagrion occidentale
Aciagrion olympicum
Aciagrion pallidum
Aciagrion pinheyi
Aciagrion rarum
Aciagrion steeleae
Aciagrion tillyardi
Aciagrion tonsillare
Aciagrion walteri
Aciagrion zambiense
Aeolagrion axine
Aeolagrion dorsale
Aeolagrion fulvum
Aeolagrion inca
Africallagma cuneistigma
Africallagma elongatum
Africallagma glaucum
Africallagma pallidulum 
Africallagma pseudelongatum
Africallagma rubristigma
Africallagma sapphirinum
Africallagma sinuatum
Africallagma subtile
Africallagma vaginale
Agriocnemis aderces
Agriocnemis alcyone
Agriocnemis aligulae
Agriocnemis angolense
Agriocnemis angustirami
Agriocnemis argentea
Agriocnemis carmelita
Agriocnemis clauseni
Agriocnemis corbeti
Agriocnemis dabreui
Agriocnemis dissimilis
Agriocnemis dobsoni
Agriocnemis exilis
Agriocnemis exsudans
Agriocnemis falcifera
Agriocnemis femina
Agriocnemis forcipata
Agriocnemis gratiosa
Agriocnemis interrupta
Agriocnemis inversa
Agriocnemis kelarensis
Agriocnemis kunjina
Agriocnemis lacteola
Agriocnemis luteola
Agriocnemis maclachlani
Agriocnemis merina
Agriocnemis minima
Agriocnemis nana
Agriocnemis palaeforma
Agriocnemis pieli
Agriocnemis pieris
Agriocnemis pinheyi
Agriocnemis pygmaea
Agriocnemis ruberrima
Agriocnemis rubricauda
Agriocnemis salomonis
Agriocnemis sania
Agriocnemis splendissima
Agriocnemis thoracalis
Agriocnemis victoria
Agriocnemis zerafica
Amorphostigma armstrongi
Amorphostigma auricolor
Amphiagrion abbreviatum
Amphiagrion intermediate
Amphiagrion saucium
Amphiallagma parvum
Amphicnemis amabilis
Amphicnemis annae
Amphicnemis bicolor
Amphicnemis billitonis
Amphicnemis bonita
Amphicnemis cantuga
Amphicnemis circularis
Amphicnemis dactylostyla
Amphicnemis dentifer
Amphicnemis ecornuta
Amphicnemis erminea
Amphicnemis flavicornis
Amphicnemis furcata
Amphicnemis glauca
Amphicnemis gracilis
Amphicnemis incallida
Amphicnemis kuiperi
Amphicnemis lestoides
Amphicnemis madelenae
Amphicnemis mariae
Amphicnemis martini
Amphicnemis pandanicola
Amphicnemis platystyla
Amphicnemis remiger
Amphicnemis smedleyi
Amphicnmeis wallacii
Andinagrion garrisoni
Andinagrion peterseni
Andinagrion saliceti
Angelagrion fredericoi
Angelagrion nathaliae
Anisagrion allopterum
Anisagrion inornatum
Anisagrion kennedyi
Anisagrion truncatipenne
Antiagrion antigone
Antiagrion blanchardi
Antiagrion gayi
Antiagrion grinbergsi
Apanisagrion lais
Archboldargia gloriosa
Archboldargia mirifica
Archboldargia scissorhandsi
Archibasis crucigera
Archibasis incisura
Archibasis melanocyana
Archibasis mimetes
Archibasis oscillans
Archibasis rebeccae
Archibasis tenella
Archibasis viola
Argentagrion ambiguum
Argentagrion silviae
Argia adamsi
Argia agrioides
Argia alberta
Argia albistigma
Argia ambigua
Argia anceps
Argia apicalis
Argia barretti
Argia bicellulata
Argia bipunctulata
Argia botacudo
Argia calida
Argia carlcooki
Argia chapadae
Argia chelata
Argia claussenii
Argia collata
Argia concinna
Argia croceipennis
Argia cupraurea
Argia cuprea
Argia cyathigera
Argia deami
Argia difficilis
Argia dives
Argia eliptica
Argia emma
Argia euphorbia
Argia extranea
Argia fissa
Argia fraudatricula
Argia frequentula
Argia fulgida
Argia fumigata
Argia fumipennis
Argia funcki
Argia funebris
Argia garrisoni
Argia gaumeri
Argia gerhardi
Argia hamulata
Argia harknessi
Argia hasemani
Argia herberti
Argia hinei
Argia huanacina
Argia immunda
Argia impura
Argia inculta
Argia indicatrix
Argia indocilis
Argia infrequentula
Argia infumata
Argia insipida
Argia iralai
Argia jocosa
Argia joergenseni
Argia johannella
Argia jujuya
Argia kokama
Argia lacrimans
Argia leonorae
Argia lilacina
Argia limitata
Argia lugens
Argia medullaris
Argia mishuyaca
Argia modesta
Argia moesta
Argia mollis
Argia munda
Argia nahuana
Argia nigrior
Argia oculata
Argia oenea
Argia orichalcea
Argia pallens
Argia percellulata
Argia pima
Argia pipila
Argia plana
Argia pocomana
Argia popoluca
Argia pulla
Argia reclusa
Argia rectangula
Argia rhoadsi
Argia rogersi
Argia rosseri
Argia sabino
Argia sedula
Argia serva
Argia smithiana
Argia sordida
Argia subapicalis
Argia talamanca
Argia tamoyo
Argia tarascana
Argia terira
Argia tezpi
Argia thespis
Argia tibialis
Argia tinctipennis
Argia tonto
Argia translata
Argia tupi
Argia ulmeca
Argia underwoodi
Argia variabilis
Argia variata
Argia variegata
Argia vivida
Argia westfalli
Argia yungensis
Argiagrion leoninum
Argiocnemis ensifera
Argiocnemis rubescens
Argiocnemis solitaria
Argiocnemis umbargae
Austroagrion cyane
Austroagrion exclamationis
Austroagrion pindrina
Austroagrion watsoni
Austroallagma sagittiferum
Austrocnemis maccullochi 
Austrocnemis obscura 
Austrocnemis splendida
Azuragrion buchholzi
Azuragrion granti
Azuragrion kauderni
Azuragrion nigridorsum
Azuragrion somalicum
Azuragrion vansomereni
Bedfordia demorsa
Bedfordia halecarpenteri
Boninagrion ezoin
Bromeliagrion beebeanum
Bromeliagrion fernandezianum
Bromeliagrion rehni
Caliagrion billinghursti
Calvertagrion minutissimum
Ceriagrion aeruginosum
Ceriagrion annulosum
Ceriagrion auranticum
Ceriagrion auritum
Ceriagrion azureum
Ceriagrion bakeri
Ceriagrion batjanum
Ceriagrion bellona
Ceriagrion calamineum
Ceriagrion cerinorubellum
Ceriagrion chaoi
Ceriagrion citrinum
Ceriagrion coeruleum
Ceriagrion corallinum
Ceriagrion coromandelianum
Ceriagrion fallax
Ceriagrion georgifreyi
Ceriagrion glabrum
Ceriagrion hamoni
Ceriagrion hoogerwerfi
Ceriagrion ignitum
Ceriagrion inaequale
Ceriagrion indochinense
Ceriagrion katamborae
Ceriagrion kordofanicum
Ceriagrion lieftincki
Ceriagrion madagazureum
Ceriagrion malaisei
Ceriagrion melanurum
Ceriagrion moorei
Ceriagrion mourae
Ceriagrion nigroflavum
Ceriagrion nigrolineatum
Ceriagrion nipponicum
Ceriagrion oblongulum
Ceriagrion olivaceum
Ceriagrion pallidum
Ceriagrion platystigma
Ceriagrion praetermissum
Ceriagrion rubellocerinum
Ceriagrion rubiae
Ceriagrion sakejii
Ceriagrion sanguinostigma
Ceriagrion sinense
Ceriagrion suave
Ceriagrion tenellum
Ceriagrion tricrenaticeps
Ceriagrion varians
Ceriagrion whellani
Chromagrion conditum
Chrysobasis buchholzi
Chrysobasis lucifer
Coenagriocnemis insulare
Coenagriocnemis ramburi 
Coenagriocnemis reuniense
Coenagriocnemis rufipes
Coenagrion amurense
Coenagrion angulatum
Coenagrion antiquum
Coenagrion armatum
Coenagrion australocaspicum
Coenagrion bartenevi
Coenagrion bifurcatum
Coenagrion brevicauda
Coenagrion caerulescens
Coenagrion castellani 
Coenagrion chusanicum 
Coenagrion ecornutum
Coenagrion exornatum
Coenagrion glaciale 
Coenagrion hastulatum  
Coenagrion holdereri
Coenagrion hylas
Coenagrion intermedium
Coenagrion interrogatum 
Coenagrion johanssoni 
Coenagrion kashmirum 
Coenagrion lanceolatum
Coenagrion lehmanni 
Coenagrion lunulatum
Coenagrion lyelli
Coenagrion melanoproctum
Coenagrion mercuriale
Coenagrion ornatum 
Coenagrion persicum
Coenagrion ponticum
Coenagrion puella
Coenagrion pulchellum 
Coenagrion resolutum 
Coenagrion scitulum
Coenagrion simillimum
Coenagrion striatum
Coenagrion syriacum 
Coenagrion terue 
Coenagrion tugur
Coenagrion vanbrinkae
Cyanallagma angelae
Cyanallagma bonariense
Cyanallagma ferenigrum
Cyanallagma interruptum
Cyanallagma nigrinuchale
Cyanallagma trimaculatum
Denticulobasis ariken 
Denticulobasis dunklei
Denticulobasis garrisoni
Diceratobasis macrogaster
Diceratobasis melanogaster
Dolonagrion fulvellum
Enacantha caribbea
Enallagma ambiguum
Enallagma anna
Enallagma annexum
Enallagma antennatum
Enallagma aspersum
Enallagma basidens
Enallagma boreale
Enallagma cardenium
Enallagma carunculatum
Enallagma circulatum
Enallagma civile
Enallagma clausum
Enallagma coecum
Enallagma concisum
Enallagma cyathigerum
Enallagma daeckii
Enallagma davisi
Enallagma deserti
Enallagma divagans
Enallagma doubledayi
Enallagma dubium
Enallagma durum
Enallagma ebrium
Enallagma eiseni
Enallagma exsulans
Enallagma geminatum
Enallagma hageni
Enallagma insula
Enallagma laterale
Enallagma longfieldae
Enallagma maldivense
Enallagma minusculum
Enallagma nigrolineatum
Enallagma novaehispaniae
Enallagma pallidum
Enallagma pictum
Enallagma pollutum
Enallagma praevarum
Enallagma recurvatum
Enallagma risi
Enallagma rua
Enallagma schmidti
Enallagma semicirculare
Enallagma signatum
Enallagma sulcatum
Enallagma traviatum
Enallagma truncatum
Enallagma vernale
Enallagma vesperum
Enallagma weewa
Erythromma humerale
Erythromma lindenii
Erythromma najas
Erythromma tinctipennis
Erythromma viridulum
Hesperagrion heterodoxum
Himalagrion exclamatione
Himalagrion pithoragarhicus
Homeoura chelifera
Homeoura lindneri
Homeoura nepos
Homeoura obrieni
Homeoura sobrina
Hylaeargia magnifica
Hylaeargia simulatrix
Hylaeonympha magoi
Inpabasis hubelli
Inpabasis machadoi
Inpabasis rosea
Ischnura abyssinica
Ischnura acuticauda
Ischnura albistigma
Ischnura aralensis
Ischnura ariel
Ischnura asiatica
Ischnura aurora
Ischnura barberi
Ischnura bizonata
Ischnura blumi
Ischnura buxtoni
Ischnura capreola
Ischnura capreolus
Ischnura cardinalis
Ischnura carpenteri
Ischnura cervula
Ischnura chromostigma
Ischnura cruzi
Ischnura damula
Ischnura demorsa
Ischnura denticollis
Ischnura dorothea
Ischnura elegans
Ischnura erratica
Ischnura evansi
Ischnura filosa
Ischnura fluviatilis
Ischnura forcipata
Ischnura fountainei
Ischnura fragilis
Ischnura gemina
Ischnura genei
Ischnura graellsii
Ischnura haemastigma
Ischnura haritonovi
Ischnura hastata
Ischnura heterosticta
Ischnura inarmata
Ischnura indivisa
Ischnura intermedia
Ischnura isoetes
Ischnura kellicotti
Ischnura lobata
Ischnura luta
Ischnura ordosi
Ischnura pamelae
Ischnura patricia
Ischnura perparva
Ischnura posita
Ischnura prognata
Ischnura pruinescens
Ischnura pumilio
Ischnura ramburii
Ischnura rhodosoma
Ischnura rubella
Ischnura rubilio
Ischnura rufostigma
Ischnura rufovittata
Ischnura saharensis
Ischnura sanguinostigma
Ischnura senegalensis
Ischnura spinicauda
Ischnura stueberi
Ischnura taitensis
Ischnura thelmae
Ischnura torresiana
Ischnura ultima
Ischnura verticalis
Ischnura vinsoni
Leptagrion aculeatum
Leptagrion acutum
Leptagrion afonsoi
Leptagrion andromache
Leptagrion bocainense
Leptagrion capixabae
Leptagrion croceum
Leptagrion dardanoi
Leptagrion dispar
Leptagrion elongatum
Leptagrion fernandezianum
Leptagrion garbei
Leptagrion macrurum
Leptagrion perlongum
Leptagrion porrectum
Leptagrion siqueirai
Leptagrion vriesianum
Leptabasis candelaria
Leptobasis melinogaster
Leptobasis raineyi
Leptobasis vacillans
Leucobasis candicans
Megalagrion adytum
Megalagrion amaurodytum
Megalagrion blackburni
Megalagrion calliphya
Megalagrion deceptor
Megalagrion dinesiotes
Megalagrion eudytum
Megalagrion hawaiiense
Megalagrion heterogamias
Megalagrion jugorum
Megalagrion kauaiense
Megalagrion koelense
Megalagrion leptodemas
Megalagrion mauka
Megalagrion molokaiense
Megalagrion nesiotes
Megalagrion nigrohamatum
Megalagrion oahuense
Megalagrion oceanicum
Megalagrion oresitrophum
Megalagrion orobates
Megalagrion pacificum
Megalagrion paludicola
Megalagrion vagabundum
Megalagrion williamsoni
Megalagrion xanthomelas
Melanesobasis annulata
Melanesobasis bicellulare
Melanesobasis corniculata
Melanesobasis flavilabris
Melanesobasis macleani
Melanesobasis maculosa
Melanesobasis prolixa
Melanesobasis simmondsi
Mesamphiagrion demarmelsi
Mesamphiagrion dunklei
Mesamphiagrion ecuatoriale
Mesamphiagrion gaianii
Mesamphiagrion laterale
Mesamphiagrion occultum
Mesamphiagrion ovigerum
Mesamphiagrion risi
Mesamphiagrion tamaense
Mesamphiagrion tepuianum
Mesoleptobasis acuminata
Mesoleptobasis cantralli
Mesoleptobasis cyanolineata
Mesoleptobasis elongata
Mesoleptobasis incus
Metaleptobasis amazonica
Metaleptobasis bicornis
Metaleptobasis bovilla
Metaleptobasis brysonima
Metaleptobasis diceras
Metaleptobasis fernandezi
Metaleptobasis foreli
Metaleptobasis incisula
Metaleptobasis lillianae
Metaleptobasis manicaria
Metaleptobasis mauffrayi
Metaleptobasis mauritia
Metaleptobasis minteri
Metaleptobasis quadricornis
Metaleptobasis selysi
Metaleptobasis tetragena
Metaleptobasis weibezahni
Metaleptobasis westfalli
Millotagrion inaequistigma
Minagrion caldense
Minagrion canaanense
Minagrion mecistogastrum
Minagrion ribeiroi
Minagrion waltheri
Moroagrion danielli
Mortonagrion aborense
Mortonagrion amoenum
Mortonagrion appendiculatum
Mortonagrion arthuri
Mortonagrion ceylonicum
Mortonagrion falcatum
Mortonagrion forficulatum
Mortonagrion hirosei
Mortonagrion martini
Mortonagrion selenion
Mortonagrion stygium
Mortonagrion varralli
Nehalennia gracilis 
Nehalennia integricollis
Nehalennia irene 
Nehalennia minuta
Nehalennia pallidula
Nehalennia speciosa
Neoerythromma cultellatum
Neoerythromma gladiolatum
Nesobasis angulicollis
Nesobasis aurantiaca
Nesobasis bidens
Nesobasis brachycerca
Nesobasis caerulecaudata
Nesobasis caerulescens
Nesobasis campioni
Nesobasis comosa
Nesobasis erythrops
Nesobasis flavifrons
Nesobasis flavostigma
Nesobasis heteroneura
Nesobasis ingens
Nesobasis leveri
Nesobasis longistyla
Nesobasis malcolmi
Nesobasis malekulana
Nesobasis monticola
Nesobasis nigrostigma
Nesobasis pedata
Nesobasis recava
Nesobasis rufostigma
Nesobasis selysi
Nesobasis telegastrum
Onychargia atrocyana
Onychargia vittigera
Oreagrion armeniacum
Oreagrion lorentzi
Oreagrion oreadum
Oreagrion pectingi
Oreagrion xanthocyane
Oreiallagma acutum
Oreiallagma oreas
Oreiallagma prothoracicum
Oreiallagma quadricolor
Oreiallagma thelkterion
Oxyagrion ablutum
Oxyagrion basale
Oxyagrion brevistigma
Oxyagrion bruchi
Oxyagrion chapadense
Oxyagrion evanescens
Oxyagrion fernandoi
Oxyagrion haematinum
Oxyagrion hempeli
Oxyagrion hermosae
Oxyagrion imeriense
Oxyagrion impunctatum
Oxyagrion machadoi
Oxyagrion microstigma
Oxyagrion miniopsis
Oxyagrion pavidum
Oxyagrion pseudocardinale
Oxyagrion rubidum
Oxyagrion santosi
Oxyagrion simile
Oxyagrion sulinum
Oxyagrion sulmatogrossense
Oxyagrion tennesseni
Oxyagrion tennesseni
Oxyagrion terminale
Oxyagrion zielmae
Oxyallagma dissidens
Pacificagrion dolorosa
Pacificagrion lachrymosa
Papuagrion auriculatum
Papuagrion carcharodon
Papuagrion corruptum
Papuagrion degeneratum
Papuagrion flavipedum
Papuagrion flavithorax
Papuagrion fraterculum
Papuagrion gurneyi
Papuagrion laminatum
Papuagrion magnanimum
Papuagrion occipitale
Papuagrion prothoracale
Papuagrion rectangulare
Papuagrion reductum
Papuagrion rufipedum
Papuagrion spinicaudum
Papuargia stuberi
Paracercion barbatum
Paracercion calamorum
Paracercion dyeri
Paracercion hieroglyphicum
Paracercion impar
Paracercion luzonicum
Paracercion malayanum
Paracercion melanotum
Paracercion pendulum
Paracercion plagiosum
Paracercion sieboldii
Paracercion v-nigrum
Paracercion yunnanensis
Pericnemis stictica 
Pericnemis triangularis
Phoenicagrion flammeum
Phoenicagrion paulsoni
Pinheyagrion angolicum
Plagulibasis ciliata
Proischnura polychromaticum
Proischnura rotundipenne
Proischnura subfurcatum
Protallagma titicacae
Pseudagrion acaciae
Pseudagrion aguessei
Pseudagrion alcicorne
Pseudagrion ambatoroae
Pseudagrion ampolomitae
Pseudagrion andamanicum
Pseudagrion angolense
Pseudagrion apicale
Pseudagrion approximatum
Pseudagrion arabicum
Pseudagrion assegaii
Pseudagrion aureofrons
Pseudagrion australasiae
Pseudagrion azureum
Pseudagrion basicornu
Pseudagrion bernardi
Pseudagrion bicoerulans
Pseudagrion bidentatum
Pseudagrion buenafei
Pseudagrion caffrum
Pseudagrion calosomum
Pseudagrion camerunense
Pseudagrion celebense
Pseudagrion cheliferum
Pseudagrion chloroceps
Pseudagrion cingillum
Pseudagrion citricola
Pseudagrion civicum
Pseudagrion coarctatum
Pseudagrion coelestis
Pseudagrion coeruleipunctum
Pseudagrion commoniae
Pseudagrion coomansi
Pseudagrion coriaceum
Pseudagrion crocops
Pseudagrion cyathiforme
Pseudagrion deconcertans
Pseudagrion decorum
Pseudagrion deningi
Pseudagrion dispar
Pseudagrion divaricatum
Pseudagrion draconis
Pseudagrion dundoense
Pseudagrion emarginatum
Pseudagrion epiphonematicum
Pseudagrion estesi
Pseudagrion evanidum
Pseudagrion farinicolle
Pseudagrion fisheri
Pseudagrion flavipes
Pseudagrion furcigerum
Pseudagrion gamblesi
Pseudagrion giganteum
Pseudagrion gigas
Pseudagrion glaucescens
Pseudagrion glaucoideum
Pseudagrion greeni
Pseudagrion grilloti
Pseudagrion guichardi
Pseudagrion hageni
Pseudagrion hamoni
Pseudagrion hamulus
Pseudagrion helenae
Pseudagrion hypermelas
Pseudagrion igniceps
Pseudagrion ignifer
Pseudagrion incisurum
Pseudagrion inconspicuum
Pseudagrion indicum
Pseudagrion ingrid
Pseudagrion inopinatum
Pseudagrion jedda
Pseudagrion kaffinum
Pseudagrion kersteni
Pseudagrion kibalense
Pseudagrion laidlawi
Pseudagrion lalakense
Pseudagrion lindicum
Pseudagrion lucidum
Pseudagrion lucifer
Pseudagrion macrolucidum
Pseudagrion makabusiense
Pseudagrion malabaricum
Pseudagrion malagasoides
Pseudagrion malgassicum
Pseudagrion massaicum
Pseudagrion melanicterum
Pseudagrion mellisi
Pseudagrion merina
Pseudagrion microcephalum
Pseudagrion mohelii
Pseudagrion newtoni
Pseudagrion nigripes
Pseudagrion nigrofasciatum
Pseudagrion niloticum
Pseudagrion nubicum
Pseudagrion olsufieffi
Pseudagrion pacificum
Pseudagrion palauense
Pseudagrion papuense
Pseudagrion pelecotomum
Pseudagrion perfuscatum
Pseudagrion pilidorsum
Pseudagrion pontogenes
Pseudagrion pruinosum
Pseudagrion pterauratum
Pseudagrion punctum
Pseudagrion quadrioculatum
Pseudagrion renaudi
Pseudagrion risi
Pseudagrion rubriceps
Pseudagrion rufocinctum
Pseudagrion rufostigma
Pseudagrion salisburyense
Pseudagrion samoensis
Pseudagrion schmidtianum
Pseudagrion serrulatum
Pseudagrion seyrigi
Pseudagrion silaceum
Pseudagrion simile
Pseudagrion simonae
Pseudagrion simplicilaminatum
Pseudagrion sjostedti
Pseudagrion spencei
Pseudagrion spernatum
Pseudagrion spinithoracicum
Pseudagrion starreanum
Pseudagrion stuckenbergi
Pseudagrion sublacteum
Pseudagrion sudanicum
Pseudagrion symoensii
Pseudagrion syriacum
Pseudagrion thenartum
Pseudagrion tinctipenne
Pseudagrion torridum
Pseudagrion tricornis
Pseudagrion trigonale
Pseudagrion umsingaziense
Pseudagrion ungulatum
Pseudagrion ustum
Pseudagrion vaalense
Pseudagrion vakoanae
Pseudagrion vumbaense
Pseudagrion williamsi
Pseudagrion williamsoni
Pyrrhosoma elisabethae
Pyrrhosoma nymphula
Pyrrhosoma tinctipenne
Rhodischnura nursei
Schistolobos boliviensis
Skiallagma baueri
Stenagrion dubium
Stenagrion petermilleri
Teinobasis aerides
Teinobasis agriocnemis
Teinobasis albula
Teinobasis alluaudi
Teinobasis alternans
Teinobasis aluensis
Teinobasis angusticlavia
Teinobasis annamalija
Teinobasis ariel
Teinobasis aurea
Teinobasis bradleyi
Teinobasis budeni
Teinobasis buwaldai
Teinobasis carolinensis
Teinobasis chionopleura
Teinobasis combusta
Teinobasis corolla
Teinobasis debeauforti
Teinobasis debeauxi
Teinobasis dolabrata
Teinobasis dominula
Teinobasis euglena
Teinobasis filamenta
Teinobasis filiformis
Teinobasis filum
Teinobasis fortis
Teinobasis fulgens
Teinobasis gracillima
Teinobasis hamalaineni
Teinobasis helvola
Teinobasis imitans
Teinobasis kiautai
Teinobasis kirbyi
Teinobasis laglaizei
Teinobasis laidlawi
Teinobasis lorquini
Teinobasis luciae
Teinobasis malawiensis
Teinobasis metallica
Teinobasis micans
Teinobasis nigra
Teinobasis nigrolutea
Teinobasis nitescens
Teinobasis obtusilingua
Teinobasis olivacea
Teinobasis olthofi
Teinobasis palauensis
Teinobasis ponapensis
Teinobasis pretiosa
Teinobasis prothoracica
Teinobasis pulverulenta
Teinobasis rajah
Teinobasis ranee
Teinobasis recurva
Teinobasis rubricauda
Teinobasis ruficollis
Teinobasis rufithorax
Teinobasis samaritis
Teinobasis scintillans
Teinobasis serena
Teinobasis simulans
Teinobasis sjupp
Teinobasis stigmatizans
Teinobasis strigosa
Teinobasis suavis
Teinobasis superba
Teinobasis tenuis
Teinobasis wallacei
Telagrion boliviense
Telagrion cornicauda
Telagrion diceras
Telagrion longum
Telagrion macilenta
Telagrion mourei 
Telagrion nathaliae
Telagrion oreas
Telagrion quadricolor
Telebasis abuna
Telebasis aurea
Telebasis bastiaani
Telebasis bickorum
Telebasis boomsmae
Telebasis brevis
Telebasis byersi
Telebasis carmesina
Telebasis carminita
Telebasis carota
Telebasis carvalhoi
Telebasis coccinea
Telebasis collopistes
Telebasis corallina
Telebasis corbeti
Telebasis demarara
Telebasis digiticollis
Telebasis dominicana
Telebasis dunklei
Telebasis erythrina
Telebasis farcimentum
Telebasis filiola
Telebasis flammeola
Telebasis fluviatilis
Telebasis garleppi
Telebasis garrisoni
Telebasis gigantea
Telebasis griffinii
Telebasis inalata
Telebasis incolumis
Telebasis isthmica
Telebasis leptocyclia
Telebasis levis
Telebasis livida
Telebasis milleri
Telebasis obsoleta
Telebasis paraensei
Telebasis racenisi
Telebasis rubricauda
Telebasis salva
Telebasis sanguinalis
Telebasis selaopyge
Telebasis simulacrum
Telebasis simulata
Telebasis theodori
Telebasis versicolor
Telebasis vulcanoae
Telebasis vulnerata
Telebasis watsoni
Telebasis williamsoni
Telebasis willinki
Tepuibasis chimantai
Tepuibasis fulva 
Tepuibasis garciana
Tepuibasis neblinae
Tepuibasis nigra
Tepuibasis rubicunda 
Tepuibasis thea
Thermagrion webbianum
Tigriagrion aurantinigrum
Tuberculobasis arara
Tuberculobasis cardinalis
Tuberculobasis costalimai
Tuberculobasis geijskesi
Tuberculobasis guarani
Tuberculobasis inversa
Tuberculobasis karitiana
Tuberculobasis macuxi
Tuberculobasis mammilaris
Tuberculobasis tirio
Tuberculobasis yanomami
Xanthagrion erythroneurum
Xanthocnemis sinclairi
Xanthocnemis sobrina
Xanthocnemis tuanuii
Xanthocnemis zealandica
Xiphiagrion cyanomelas
Xiphiagrion truncatum
Zoniagrion exclamationis

References